Pennon Foreign Language School, Beijing,  founded in 2008, is a full-time high school which is authorized in China by Edexcel, the UK's largest A-level examination organization.

Pennon Foreign Language School, Beijing, currently offers IGCSE, A-Level and GAC courses. Pennon is currently the largest Edexcel British curriculum school in China. And the average scores of GCE-A Level ranks first in Edexcel’ peers in China.

Academic 
Over the past eight years, at Pennon Foreign Language School, Beijing, there were 56 students admitted to Oxford, Cambridge university, Caltech, Columbia University and the University of Pennsylvania. More than 300 students enrolled in the world's top ten universities, such as Imperial College and University College London. Besides, over 1,600 students were admitted to the world's top 100 universities. In 2014, there were 46 students received the interview invitation to Oxford and Cambridge University. The average GPA of GCE-A Level in Pennon Foreign Language School is 263 and the school's GPA is the top five in the same UK high schools.

In 2014, Pennon won the 2014 Pearson Edexcel Excellence Center Award. And the President Guo Hong was awarded “international education outstanding contribution award” in Asia by Edexcel Examination Authority for the first time in the past 10 years. In addition, the school has been awarded the title of "Most Influential Educational Brand"and "China's Most Comprehensive Strength Education Group" in successive years by Sina.com and Xinhuanet.com.

Faculty 
Pennon Foreign Language School, Beijing, chooses the best teachers around the world. Three of the seven Outstanding Teacher Awards are from Pennon Foreign Language School (Beijing) in the Edexcel China Conference in 2016. The teachers are divided into "oversea returnee" teachers and foreign teachers. These teachers were graduated from the prestigious universities like National University of Singapore, Nottingham University, University of Melbourne, University of Texas and many other top universities. Their goals are simple. Academic standards and the quality and physical development of students are both to train sound persons rather than candidates

Students Activities 
At Pennon Foreign Language School, Beijing, extracurricular activities are complementary to classroom teaching. Pennon's student community activities are in full swing. In order to cultivate responsible citizens in the future, the school has always encouraged students to organize themselves and evaluate themselves. The school hopes that when they grow up, they will have the ability to choose their own work and life with an independent value system and action force. And they will be inclusive and be the citizens who have the ability to bring well-being to themselves, their families and the whole society.

In addition, the school also organized students carrying out volunteer activities to Thailand, Cambodia, Tanzania, Vietnam, the Fiji Islands and other countries to help students become citizens with universal spirit. The school also achieved excellent results in a number of competitions. In 2016, the school ranked seventh in the world in the Euclid Competition of University of Waterloo and ranked 10th in the whole country in the ASDAN Math Tournament. The business competition club in the school also won the Outstanding Company Award in the DECA-Microbiz, the national high school students' business competition, ranking first in the category of technology innovation companies.

Students Clubs 
 Model United Nations         Business and Economics Club                          Basketball JR/SR Girls
 Math Club                    Basketball JR/SR Boys                               Volleyball JR/SR Boys
 Volleyball JR/SR Girls       Badminton                                           Table Tennis
 Track and Field              Tennis                                              Fashion & Design
 Guitar                       UNICEF                                              Amnastey International
 Robotics                     Chess                                               Debate Society
 Religious Studies            Photography                                         Swimming
 Chinese Drama                English Drama                                       J-pop 
 Calligraphy                   Eco-action                                          Choir

Teaching 
Pennon Foreign Language School, Beijing, in strict accordance with the teaching requirements of British Edexcel Examination Authority, opens a variety of compulsory courses and electives. These courses cover humanities, mathematics, art, design and other categories. These courses match students' interests and learning potential to make them more active and focus on exploration. In addition, their temperament gets more active and their physical fitness conditions get well. From the professional distribution of Pennon graduates to the universities of the US, Britain, Canada, Australia, Switzerland, Hong Kong and other places, we can see that the effect of curriculum allocation is getting better and better.

Courses 
English (IGCSE, GCE-A Level)

Chinese (IGCSE First/Second, GCE-A level)

Mathematics (IGCSE, GCE-A Level, Advanced Placement)

Further Mathematics (IGCSE, GCE-A Level)

Chemistry (IGCSE, GCE A-Level, Advanced Placement)

Physics (IGCSE, GCE A-Level, Advanced Placement)

Economics (IGCSE, GCE A-Level, Advanced Placement)

Business Studies (IGCSE, GCE A-Level)

Accounting (GCE A-Level)

Geography (IGCSE, GCE A-Level, Advanced Placement)

History (IGCSE, GCE A-Level, Advanced Placement)

Psychology (Advanced Placement)

Music (IGCSE, GCE A-Level)

Art (IGCSE, GCE A-Level)

Accreditation 
Pennon Foreign Language School, Beijing, is the test center of IGCSE and GCE A-Level authorized by Edexcel. Its examination centre code is 93869.

References 

2008 establishments in China
British international schools in China
Language schools in China